The following is a list of international organization leaders in 2010.

UN organizations

Political and economic organizations

Financial organizations

Sports organizations

Other organizations

See also
List of state leaders in 2010
List of religious leaders in 2010
List of international organization leaders in 2009
List of international organization leaders in 2011

References

2010
2010 in international relations
Lists of office-holders in 2010